A headland is a point of land extending into the sea. The Philippines, being an archipelagic country of 7,107 islands, is surrounded by several bodies of water and has many headlands. Headlands around the Philippine coast are most commonly named as 'point' (punta), 'cape' (cabo) or sometimes 'head'.

Luzon

Aurora

 Agria Point
 Baler Point
 Bunga Point
 Cape Encanto
 Cape San Ildefonso
 Debutunan Point
 Delgada Point
 Diatorin Point
 Dicapanikian Point
 Dicapanisan Point
 Dijohan Point
 Disucsip Point
 Otpegon Point
 Salaysay Point
 Tarigit Point

Bataan

 Alasasin Point
 Amo Point
 Binanga Point
 Caibobo Point
 Cochinos Point
 Cubi Point
 Eman Point
 Hornos Point
 Lamao Point
 Latain Point
 Lucanin Point
 Luzon Point
 Mapalan Point
 Napot Point
 Pandan Point
 Panibatujan Point
 Pubulusan Point
 Quinauan Point
 Real Point
 Salamang Point
 San Jose Point
 Saysain Point
 Vigia Point

Batanes

 Ahau Point
 Radinan Point

Batangas

 Arenas Point
 Bagalangit Point
 Bantigue Point
 Bayanan Point
 Bocboc Point
 Borijar Point
 Buaya Point
 Cape Santiago
 Cazador Point
 Dalig Point
 Fuego Point
 Gorda Point
 Jamilo Point
 Lian Point
 Ligpo Point
 Locloc Point
 Malabrigo Point
 Malagundi Point
 Matoco Point
 Nasugbu Point
 Palo Bandera Point
 Punas Point
 San Diego Point
 San Pedrino Point
 Sepoc Point
 Subukin Point
 Talin Point

Cagayan

 Amunitan Point
 Baguio Point
 Baketbaket Point
 Batang Point
 Bolos Point
 Cabutunan Point
 Cagahan Point
 Calacongan Point
 Calansan Point
 Canaguing Point
 Cape Engaño
 Carinatan Point
 Catanapan Point
 Centinela Point
 Escarpada Point
 Gosangan Point
 Labig Point
 Lacaylacay Point
 Laton Point
 Linao Point
 Lobod Point
 Lokgok Point
 Malolog Point
 Matara Point
 Nagayaman Point
 Naglocsaden Point
 Nagsidel Point
 Nanandatan Point
 Nanisetan Point
 Naragatan Point
 Ninauan Point
 Panamahan Point
 Panti Point
 Pata Point
 Piddan Point
 Pine Point
 Piton Point
 Puac Point
 Sujiguian Point
 Taboan Point
 Tucaleg Point
 Tumulod Point
 Valleyhead

Camarines Norte

 Bacacay Point
 Banban Point
 Grove Point
 High Point
 Indan Point
 Jesus Point
 Mapingil Point
 Poctol Point
 Pulandaga Point
 Sagbungon Point
 Tanoban Point

Camarines Sur

 Dagdagen Point
 Quinabucasan Point
 Sapenitan Point

Catanduanes

 Agojo Point
 Balangona Point
 Nagumbuaya Point
 Sialat Point
 Virac Point
 Yog Point

Cavite

 Cape Corregidor
 Limit Point
 Maragondon Point
 Restinga Point
 Sangley Point

Ilocos Norte

 Blanca Point
 Burayoc Point
 Cape Bojeador
 Culili Point
 Gabot Point
 Lugot Point
 Mairaira Point
 Negra Point
 Solot Point
 Sugiab Point

Ilocos Sur

 Solvec Point
 Tamurung Point

Isabela

 Apaya Point North
 Apaya Point South
 Demacnat Point
 Digollorin Point
 Dikahitibitan Point
 Dikinamaran Point
 Dilacnadanom Point
 Dinapigue Point
 Dinatadmo Point
 Disumangit Point
 Ditolong Point
 Ditungawan Point
 Diviuisa Point
 Kanhansan Point
 Maconacon Point
 Masalansan Point
 Palanan Point

La Union

 Aringay Point
 Bauang Point
 Darigayas Point
 Poro Point

Marinduque

 Banuoro Point
 Cabuyo Point
 Cagpoc Point
 Gatala Point
 Lupac Point
 Marlanga Point
 Metati Point
 Obung Point
 Panique Point
 Salomaque Point
 Suban Point

Masbate

 Aguja Point
 Bagabayod Point
 Bagubaut Point
 Bagupantao Point
 Balaboa Point
 Bangkay Point
 Bugui Point
 Buyo Point
 Colorado Point
 Kibuaya Point
 Lucaria Point
 Mabata Point
 Madanlog Point
 Malapingan Point
 Managaysay Point
 Mariveles Point
 Matalan Point
 Matungog Point
 Northwest Point
 Pagbulungan Point
 Pulanduta Point
 Sagausauan Point
 Salipef Point
 San Rafael Point
 Tasiran Point
 Tres Marias Point

Mindoro

 Antipola Point
 Antucao Point
 Bagalayag Point
 Balingawan Point
 Binarera Point
 Cabug Point
 Calapan Point			
 Calinsungan Point
 Cape Calavite
 Colasi Point
 Cumalog Point
 Dayhagan Point
 Del Monte Point
 Escarceo Point	
 Ganting Point
 Igsoso Point
 Itbu Point
 Kalawit Point
 Lawilawi Point
 Lugta Point
 Mahaba Point
 Manog Point
 Mansiol Point
 Natalon Point
 Palapag Point
 Pantocomi Point
 Pauican Point
 Pinagdagatan Point
 Quebrada Point
 Sala Point
 Salangan Point
 Tabasi Point
 Tambi Point
 Tanawan Point	
 Tubile Point
 Tumbuga Point

Palawan

 Abrupt Point
 Albion Head
 Alimudin Point
 Amalingat Point
 Amianan Point
 Anepahan Point
 Apaopurewan Point
 Arton Point
 Atog Point
 Baboy Daraga Point
 Bacao Point
 Bagman Point
 Bagtasan Point
 Bahia Honda Point
 Baja Point
 Balabuan Point
 Balaganon Point
 Balintang Point
 Baliog Point
 Balolo Point
 Bancabancao Point
 Banisi Point
 Bantigue Point
 Barbacan Point
 Baringbaring Point
 Barranca Point
 Bato-Bato Point
 Bay Point
 Bigaongan Point
 Binangculan Point
 Binayan Point
 Binga Point
 Binoong Point
 Bivouac Point
 Biyalaso Point
 Black Rock Point
 Bluff Point
 Bobosawen Point
 Bocao Point
 Bokal Point
 Bokbok Point
 Bold Head
 Bolotoc Point
 Broughton Point
 Bububulavan Point
 Bulawan Point
 Bullock Point
 Bulybarco Point
 Cabugao Point
 Cabuli Point
 Cagpasla Point
 Calasag Point
 Calis Point
 Calitan Point
 Calungan Point
 Calver Point
 Calwan Point
 Campanario Point
 Candawaga Point
 Capal Point
 Capangdanan Point
 Cape Buliluyan
 Cape Copoas
 Cape Disaster
 Cape Melville
 Cape Ross
 Caramay Point
 Caydalongdong Point
 Chichiboan Point
 Claudio Point
 Cliff Head
 Cliff Point
 Corot Point
 Crawford Point
 Cudugman Point
 Custodio Point
 Cutter Point
 Dagali Point
 Dalaganen Point
 Darocotan Point
 Decepcion Point
 Diente Point
 Difficult Point
 Dilarog Point
 Doro Point
 Dumaran Point
 Emergency Point
 Encampment Point
 Enterprise Point
 Eran Point
 Erawan Point
 Estuerzo Point
 Eustacia Point
 Flechas Point
 Gawit Point
 Gordo Point
 Green Head
 Hummock Point
 Igbars Point
 Iglesia Point
 Inipilan Point
 Inlulutoc Head
 Inobian Point
 Ipil Point
 Itaytay Point
 Kababoan Point
 Kabayosoan Point
 Kalempasayaoen Point
 Kamkitan Point
 Kaydungon Point
 Kaymamaon Point
 Lade Point
 Lambawang Point
 Laposlapos Point
 Lasang Point
 Leget Point
 Libro Point
 Ligas Point
 Limbangan Point
 Lock Point
 Locot Point
 Long Point
 Los Angeles Point
 Lotong Point
 Maasin Point
 Mabao Point
 Macorabo Point
 Madrepora Point
 Maduldulon Point
 Magtaolap Point
 Malalotoy Point
 Manabori Point
 Manas Point
 Mandalala Point
 Mantaya Point
 Manuduc Point
 Mapola Point
 Maranog Point
 Marantow Point
 Matagarien Point
 Matolaroc Point
 McLean Point
 Minagas Point
 Moorsom Point
 Moro Point
 Muslog Point
 Nagbarongas Point
 Naglieg Point
 Nagsaliang Point
 Nagsuagsuag Point
 Native Point
 North Point
 Northwest Head
 Pagananen Point
 Pagdanan Point
 Pagdurianan Point
 Pamaalan Point
 Pampoten Point
 Panacan Point
 Panagtaran Point
 Panaguman Point
 Panagurian Point
 Pancol Point
 Panganakan Point
 Pangyawan Point
 Panimusan Point
 Paodat Point
 Patuyo Point
 Peaked Point
 Penakbacican Point
 Penascosa Point
 Pescado Point
 Petes Point
 Piawi Point
 Piedras Point
 Pinos Point
 Pirata Head
 Poapoyan Point
 Providencia Point
 Punagis Point
 Putos Point
 Quenanamatan Point
 Rawnsley Point
 Relief Point
 Reminwang Point
 Reposo Point
 Rocky Point
 Sabuagan Point
 Sagasa Point
 Sagboyin Point
 Saint John Point
 Sambulawan Point
 Sarmiento Point
 Sciale Point
 Scott Point
 Seamer Point
 Separation Point
 Seribillas Point
 Shirt Point
 Sicud Point
 Sidsid Point
 Signal Head
 Sinbitan Point
 Sir James Brooke Point
 Sopioton Point
 Squall Point
 Steep Point
 Suri Point
 Tagbarungis Point
 Tagpan Point
 Tagpasek Point
 Tami Point
 Tandol Saleng Point
 Tangdol Point
 Taradungan Point
 Taritip Point
 Tarong Point
 Tarumpitao Point
 Tatahacan Point
 Tatan Juan Point
 Thumb Point
 Timbagnan Point
 Tingawan Point
 Tinugpan Point
 Tomba Point
 Townseed Point
 Treacher Point
 Tuluran Point
 Tumarbong Point
 Tuturinguen Point
 Wawa Point
 Wayway Point
 Welcome Point
 Wreck Head

Pangasinan

 Balingasay Point
 Bani Point
 Barani Point
 Caiman Point
 Cape Bolinao
 Payiban Point
 Reyna Point
 Tondul Point
 Toritori Point

Quezon

 Abuigoin Point
 Anavan Paquen Point
 Anibong Point
 Arena Point
 Bahay Point
 Banla Point
 Binaba Point
 Binangonan Point
 Bislian Point
 Bondoc Point
 Bubuluagan Point
 Bucao Point
 Caluba Point
 Capuluan Point
 Dait Point
 Dapdap Point
 Dayap Point
 Deseada Point
 Dinahican Point
 Gabriel Point
 Gerardo Point
 Gorda Point
 Juaya Point
 Kalobagus Point
 Kinabalian Point
 Laguio Point
 Lainlaingan Point
 Mabia Point
 Macabuyan Point
 Magierung Point
 Maguigtig Point
 Malagas Point
 Malanhog Point
 Malatandan Point
 Malazor Point
 Marcelino Point
 Nelocsoan Point
 Pagsanhan Point
 Pala Point
 Pangao Point
 Pedro Point
 Pinacapulan Point
 Pinagkamalingnan Point
 Prueba Point
 Pusgo Point
 Quidadanom Point
 Round Point
 Salanga Point
 Saley Point
 Salipsip Point
 Sampitan Point
 Sandoval Point
 Sangirin Point
 Silangan Point
 Tablas Point
 Tacligan Point
 Tungao Point
 Tuquian Point
 Ulalikan Point

Romblon

 Agnay Point
 Agutay Point
 Alfonso Point
 Angas Point
 Apunan Point
 Bangar Point
 Big Billat Point
 Bitaogan Point
 Bonbon Point
 Bulucabi Point
 Cabacongan Point
 Cabadiangna Point
 Cabalian Point
 Cabatungan Point
 Calabago Point
 Calaton Point
 Canapiag Point
 Canduyong Point
 Canloay Point
 Canuncag Point
 Capid Point
 Cauit Point
 Culis Point
 Diablo Point
 Gorda Point
 Goto Point
 Guinawayan Point
 Hinaguman Point
 Kapilejan Point
 Lapuslapus Point
 Lauan Point
 Lintihan Point
 Maabang Point
 Matutuna Point
 Nabagbagan Point
 Nabutahan Point
 Panas Point
 Pasilagon Point
 Pinamang-an Point
 Pitogo Point
 Puyo Point
 San Martin Point
 San Pedro Point
 Sangilan Point
 Sasaigan Point
 Sauang Point
 Suton Point
 Tinimbaan Point
 Tipolo Point
 Tunggo Point
 West Point

Sorsogon

 Agnas Point
 Bunubog Point
 Catundulan Point
 Cutcut Point
 Dumoguit Point
 Kaguyan Point
 Macuhil Point
 Padang Point
 Roja Point
 Rosa Point
 Tagiran Point
 Talagio Point
 Tawog Point

Zambales

 Alupihing Point
 Arenas Point
 Biniptican Point
 Botolan Point
 Capones Point
 Mangrove Point
 Naulo Point
 Palauig Point
 Sampaloc Point
 Santa Cruz Point

Mindanao

Agusan del Norte
 Diuata Point

Basilan

 Basilan Point
 Batupare Point
 Bolodbolod Point
 Calagusang Point
 Kulibato Point
 Malanal Point
 Mangal Point
 Panducan Point
 Sahap Point
 Saroc Point

Compostela de Oro

 Bongbong Point
 Pangasinan Point
 Piso Point

Davao del Norte

 Bassa Point
 East Point
 Gili Point
 Lasang Point
 Linao Point
 Mansaca Point
 Paet Point
 Pohum Point

Davao del Sur

 Babak Point
 Banos Point
 Batulayol Point
 Bolak Point
 Bolton Point
 Bukid Point
 Caburan Point
 Calilidan Point
 Cliff Point
 Colapsin Point
 Colian Point
 Digos Point
 Dumalag Point
 Gual Point
 Kabalantian Point
 Kalbay Point
 Kulungan Point
 Lanang Point
 Lauayon Point
 Lejan Point
 Malusi Point
 Maybio Point
 Minaban Point
 Panguil Bato Point
 Quilapi Point
 Quitaly Point
 Santa Cruz Point
 Sibalatan Point
 Sigarin Point
 Tagulaya Point
 Tambalan Point
 Tambunan Point
 Tapundo Point
 Tibunan Point
 Tigulo Point
 Tinaca Point
 Tubalan Head
 Umbakanan Point

Davao Oriental

 Alisud Point
 Arena Point
 Bacul Point
 Baculin Point
 Bais Point
 Bangal Point
 Batiano Point
 Batikual Point
 Batinao Point
 Bilat Point
 Bitaogan Point
 Bobon Point
 Buan Point
 Cabayan Point
 Cape San Agustin
 Casauman Point
 Daco Point
 Duas Point
 Gorda Point
 Guanguan Point
 Kagan Point
 Kaganuhan Point
 Kanikian Point
 Lagum Point
 Lakga Point
 Lambajon Point
 Lamigan Point
 Licoc Point
 Lilisan Point
 Lima Point
 Limut Point
 Macaonan Point
 Madtuka Point
 Manaol Point
 Manduao Point
 Nagas Point
 Padada Point
 Paypay Point
 Pusan Point
 Salasala Point
 Sumlug Point
 Tacaquinay Point
 Taganilao Point
 Talisay Point
 Tambalan Point
 Tambuc Point
 Tanguip Point
 Tataidaga Point
 Tonguil Point
 Tugubun Point
 Tumadgo Point
 Yaco Point

Dinagat Islands

 Babatnon Point
 Balukaui Point
 Berrugosa Point
 Cliff Point
 Cogan Point
 Desolation Point
 Esconchada Point
 Kalanugan Point
 Kambagio Point
 Kanakuina Point
 Kanayut Point
 Kanbandon Point
 Kanhatid Point
 Kanlibud Point
 Masdang Point
 Panamauan Point
 Pelotes Point
 Penascales Point
 Peninsula Point
 Tambungan Point
 Tamoyauas Point
 Tungo Point

Lanao del Norte

 Calibon Point
 Dugolaan Point
 Palagoya Point
 Quinalang Point

Lanao del Sur

 Lapitan Point
 Matimus Point
 Tugapangan Point

Maguindanao

 Bulsan Point
 Gardoqui Point
 Kalingmomo Point
 Liess Point
 Linao Point
 Logung Point
 Manangula Point
 Marigalupa Point
 Panilisan Point
 Quidapil Point
 Tagata Point
 Talaya Point
 Tipian Point

Misamis Occidental

 Polo Point
 Punta Miray Point
 Tabu Point

Misamis Oriental

 Ampuso Point
 Bagacay Point
 Gorda Point
 Initao Point
 Macabalan Point
 Malugan Point
 Matangad Point
 Panaon Point
 Salimbal Point
 Sipaka Point
 Solavan Point
 Tacnipa Point

Sarangani

 Bato Maputi Point
 Hagdan Point
 Labu Point
 Lefa Point
 Lun Point
 Mantalakan Point
 Matil Point
 Parang Parang Point
 Sumbang Point
 Tampat Point
 Tampuan Point
 Tango Point
 Timos Point

South Cotabato

 Calumpan Point
 Dumpao Point
 Lanson Point
 London Point
 Noyan Point
 Siu Point

Sultan Kudarat

 Bacud Point
 Cadiz Point
 Macculi Point
 Maguling Point
 Malatuna Point
 Nara Point
 Pagang Point
 Palimban Point
 Pinol Point
 Pitas Point
 Pola Point
 Sangay Point
 Tuna Point

Sulu

 Baguis Point
 Bayerstock Point
 Belan Point
 Bulasan Point
 Bunga Point
 Bulitulan Point
 Cabalian Point
 Candea Point
 Caumpang Point
 Daingapic Point
 Equet Point
 Igasan Point
 Kabuayan Point
 Karangdato Point
 Lectuan Point
 Libit Point
 Mabajoc Point
 Mangalis Point
 Noble Point
 Pandanan Point
 Putic Point
 Sagui Point
 Sibalyan Point
 Silangon Point
 Sipincal Point
 Sulang Point
 Tampakan Point
 Toonpandanan Point
 Tubingantan Point
 Tuctuc Point

Surigao del Norte

 Agukan Point
 Arena Point
 Belisan Point
 Bilar Point
 Bitogan Point
 Bucas Point
 Claver Point
 Danakit Point
 Dolores Point
 Linukbang Point
 Madilao Point
 Manao Point
 Nahikan Point
 Sampetan Point
 Sharp Point
 Sili Point
 Sugbuhan Point
 Tuason Point

Surigao del Sur

 Bakulin Point
 Catarman Point
 Cawit Point
 Conceson Point
 Jobo Point
 Lamon Point
 Panisaan Point
 Sanco Point
 Tombog Point
 Tugas Point
 Umanun Point

Tawi-Tawi

 Bacung Point
 Bagut Lapit Point
 Bakalao Point
 Ballibuug Point
 Banga Point
 Hula Point
 Kalang Point
 Languyan Point
 Matos Point
 Pandapan Point
 Sibalo Point
 Sigalawang Point
 Sikaula Point
 Tampakan Point
 Tampat Point
 Tandotao Point
 Tanduduata Point
 Tavotavo Point
 Tocanhi Point
 Tong Batu Point
 Tongausang Point
 Tumindao Point
 Tungbahan Point

Zamboanga del Norte

 Bakong Point
 Balatacan Point
 Batotindoc Point
 Blanca Point
 Bulatinao Point
 Cauit Point
 Coronado Point
 Diwait Point
 Duluquin Point
 Lamboyan Point
 Limasun Point
 Lituban Point
 Mantibo Point
 Nanca Point
 Palandok Point
 Pangian Point
 Quipit Point
 Sampoak Point
 Sibalic Point
 Sibugan Point
 Sicayab Point
 Sikanan Point
 Sindangan Point
 Siraguay Point
 Tagolo Point
 Talisay Point
 Talulu Point

Zamboanga del Sur

 Alimpaya Point
 Balungisan Point
 Batorampon Point
 Caldera Point
 Cangan Point
 Carabuca Point
 Dayana Point
 Dumanquilas Point
 Flecha Point
 Gasacan Point
 Lawigan Point
 Malasugat Point
 Masulag Point
 Mudog Point
 Quiramat Point
 Sarva Point
 Seboto Point
 Taguisian Point
 Taguite Point
 Tambatan Point
 Tambulian Point
 Tongbatu Point

Zamboanga Sibugay

 Cabog Point
 Caparan Point
 Diosan Point
 Kolasihan Point
 Lambayogan Point
 Locsica Point
 Saro Point
 Silingan Point
 Tando Magalibut Point
 Ticauan Point
 Tigbucay Point

Visayas

Biliran

 Agta Point
 Amambahag Point
 Camay Point
 Matunton Point
 Pawican Point
 Saban Point

Bohol

 Baluarte Point
 Cabulao Point
 Canopao Point
 Catarman Point
 Cocales Point
 Duljo Point
 Guinali Point
 Huagdan Point
 Lamanoc Point
 Libas Point
 Magtung Point
 Manga Point
 Napacao Point
 Nauco Point
 Punta Cruz Point
 Tahuruc Point

Cebu

 Aguaron Point
 Argao Point
 Badian Point
 Bagacay Point
 Bantigue Point
 Batatic Point
 Booc Point
 Bulalaqui Point
 Buntay Point
 Cayangon Point
 Cerro Point
 Copton Point
 Engaño Point
 Guiuanon Point
 Liloan Point
 Lungun Point
 Ogton Point
 Oslob Point
 Pungtud Point
 Talong Point
 Tango Point
 Tañon Point

Guimaras

 Alegria Point
 Bondulan Point
 Cabalic Point
 Cabugao Point
 Calabagnon Point
 Lusaran Point
 Malanay Point
 Morubuan Point
 Muhuy Point
 Pandan Point
 Tumanda Point

Leyte

Northern Leyte

 Baiwarie Point
 Burabud Point
 Camiris Point
 Canaguayan Point
 Cataisan Point
 Dungon Point
 Linganay Point
 Liog Point
 Panalaron Point
 Punud Point
 Rabin Point
 Talairan Point

Southern Leyte

 Amagusan Point
 Amogotada Point
 Binit Point
 Bolabola Point
 Caligangan Point
 Caniguin Point
 Catarman Point
 Catung Point
 Green Point
 Hingatungan Point
 Ilijan Point
 Liloan Point
 Mamban Point
 Pandan Point
 Salacot Point
 Sonok Point
 Taancan Point
 Taguus Point
 Tangbo Point
 Taytay Point

Negros

Negros Occidental

 Binigsian Point
 Bolila Point
 Bulubadian Point
 Buluguisan Point
 Calubcub Point
 Catmon Point
 Cocaguayan Point
 Ermita Point
 Gaas Point
 Maguiliguian Point
 Maquiquiling Point
 Matabang Point
 Matatindoc Point
 Obon Point
 Sojoton Point
 Tomonton Point

Negros Oriental

 Amlan Point
 Banlas Point
 Bonbonon Point
 Calongtalong Point
 Campoyo Point
 Canamay Point
 Cansilan Point
 Cauitan Point
 Colaquitan Point
 Dacung Bato Point
 Dumaguete Point
 Giligaon Point
 Siaton Point
 Tagay Point
 Tayasan Point
 Teca Point

Panay

Aklan
 Aclan Point

Antique

 Alimanga Point
 Bayo Point
 Dalipe Point
 Davis Point
 Jaldan Point
 Lipata Point
 Matasbaras Point
 Pasal Point
 Pucio Point
 Recordo Point
 Sigon Point
 Tabonan Point
 Talisay Point
 Tibiao Point
 Tubigan Point
 Tungao Point

Capiz

 Nailon Point
 Nipa Point

Iloilo

 Bacay Point
 Barigan Point
 Bulacaue Point
 Jaro Point
 Payong Point
 San Juan Point
 Tinigban Point
 Yan Point
 Zarraga Point

Samar

Eastern Samar

 Barapdaban Point
 Cagosoan Point
 Catawgan Point
 Colasi Point
 Coracoraan Point
 Handig Point
 Hilaba-an Point
 Hinablan Point
 Homoraon Point
 Kanaoayong Point
 Macatol Point
 Malistis Point
 Pondolon Point
 Punta Maria Point
 Sugaran Point
 Sungi Point
 Tugnug Point

Northern Samar

 Balot Point
 Banua Point
 Budog Point
 Cambia Point
 Cape Espiritu Santo
 Isoic Point
 Magaboak Point
 Pana Point
 Samuro Point
 Tinta Point
 Ulo Point

Western Samar

 Gapinis Point
 Madalanot Point

Siquijor

 Banlas Point
 Daquit Point
 Lumangkapan Point
 Minanulan Point
 Pahiton Point
 Sandugan Point
 Tonga Point

See also
 Geography of the Philippines
 Outline of the Philippines
 Lighthouses in the Philippines

References
Names derived from Series S501, U.S. Army Map Service, 1954– 1:250,000 scale maps of the Philippines.

Headlands